Desana (Dzan-a in Piedmontese) is a comune (municipality) in the Province of Vercelli in the Italian region Piedmont, located about  northeast of Turin and about  southwest of Vercelli.

Desana borders the following municipalities: Asigliano Vercellese, Costanzana, Lignana, Ronsecco, Tricerro, and Vercelli.

References

Cities and towns in Piedmont